The Urdaneta Philippines Temple is a planned temple of the Church of Jesus Christ of Latter-day Saints (LDS Church) under construction in Urdaneta City, Pangasinan, Philippines.

History
On 2 October 2010, during opening remarks at the Saturday morning session of the LDS Church's 180th Semiannual General Conference, church president Thomas S. Monson announced the construction of a temple in Urdaneta City, Philippines. 

The temple will be located approximately 100 miles north of Metro Manila on Luzon, the largest and most populated island in the Philippines. The Urdaneta Philippines Temple will help serve the 99 stakes and districts in the Luzon Island Group currently served by the Manila Philippines Temple.

In September 2010, ground was broken for the new mission home and office, which will be located next to the recently remodeled and expanded Urdaneta Philippines Stake Center.

In June 2011, the Philippines Baguio Mission was relocated to Urdaneta City, which offers a more central and accessible location for members and missionaries in the area.

On January 16, 2019, a groundbreaking to signify beginning of construction was held, with Jeffrey R. Holland presiding.

The temple is expected to be completed in 2022.

Temples in the Philippines
The Urdaneta Philippines Temple will be the third LDS temple built in the Philippines, following the Manila (1984) and Cebu City (2010) temples. Four more temples were announced in 2018 and 2019, which are the Alabang, Cagayan de Oro, Davao and Bacolod temples, but no dates have been set for the groundbreaking ceremonies.

See also

 The Church of Jesus Christ of Latter-day Saints in the Philippines
 Comparison of temples of The Church of Jesus Christ of Latter-day Saints
 List of temples of The Church of Jesus Christ of Latter-day Saints
 List of temples of The Church of Jesus Christ of Latter-day Saints by geographic region
 Religion in the Philippines
 Temple architecture (Latter-day Saints)

References

External links
Urdaneta Philippines Temple Official announcement
Urdaneta Philippines Temple at ChurchofJesusChristTemples.org

Proposed buildings and structures in the Philippines
Proposed religious buildings and structures of the Church of Jesus Christ of Latter-day Saints
Temples (LDS Church) in the Philippines
The Church of Jesus Christ of Latter-day Saints in the Philippines
21st-century Latter Day Saint temples
Buildings and structures in Pangasinan
Urdaneta, Pangasinan